Diospyros apiculata is a tropical tree species was described by Hiern and included in the genus Diospyros and family Ebenaceae; no subspecies are listed in the Catalogue of Life.  Its Vietnamese name is lọ nồi (sometimes thị đen).

References

External links 

apiculata
Trees of Vietnam
Flora of Indo-China